The Göppingen Gö 8 was a 1/5 scale model of the Dornier Do 214, a large projected trans-atlantic long-range flying boat, designed by Dornier Werke GmbH in Germany during World War II. The Gö 8 was used primarily to validate the hydro-dynamic and aerodynamic properties of the Do 214.

Design and development
The Gö 8 was designed and built by Wolf Hirth and Ulrich Hütter / Schempp-Hirth at Göppingen. Construction was primarily of wood, with smooth surfaces, replicating the planing surfaces in scale. A retractable tailwheel undercarriage was installed in the hull. The pilot sat under a long greenhouse canopy which followed the profiles of the proposed Do 214, giving good visibility. Accommodation for a flight test engineer was provided in the hull behind the pilot.

Operational history
The Gö 8 flight trials were undertaken at Oberpfaffenhofen, with hydrodynamic testing on Bodensee, towed by a motorboat. Further aerodynamic testing was carried out at the Göttingen aeronautical research laboratory.

Specifications (Gö 8)

References

External links
 Planeurs : Göppingen Gö-8

1940s German experimental aircraft
Glider aircraft
Flying boats